The Urban Rural Mission is a programme of the World Council of Churches. It started with the Council's third assembly in New Delhi (1961), when concerns were raised about mission in urban and industrial societies.

References

World Council of Churches